The MCI J-Series is a model of motorcoach bus produced by Motor Coach Industries (MCI). The bus is primarily used by tour and charter bus operators. It is sold alongside the MCI D-Series bus, primarily used by intercity bus services and public transit operators. 

The J-Series was introduced in 2001 initially as a mid-range supplement for the D- and E-Series coaches in the MCI coach lineup. It is manufactured at the main plant in Pembina, North Dakota, United States as well as in Winnipeg, Manitoba, Canada.

Development

Background

In 1998, MCI introduced the 102-EL3. Also known as the Renaissance, it was a new coach introduced to compete with the Prevost H-Series. The E-Series featured an all new body (designed by Designworks) and it introduced many new features such as a curved stepwell, a steerable tag axle, electronically controlled air suspension and disc brakes. Due to the rushed develompent of the E-Series, some of the coach's features were unreliable at the beginning prompting MCI to develop a companion coach model. In 2001, the 102-EL3 was renamed to the E4500 bringing it in line with MCI's new nomenclature for their coaches.

Introduction
In 2001, MCI introduced the J-Series at the 2001 UMA Motorcoach Expo. The J-Series retained most of the Designworks designed body from the E-Series but with minor changes. However, many of the new on-board technologies on the E-Series were removed in order to appeal to customers looking for a coach with a modern design with more simple on-board technologies.

Variants

J4500
The J4500 was introduced in 2001 as a model to fill the gap in MCI's product line between the D4500 and E4500. It combined the modern design of the E-Series with the simpler technologies of the D-Series. In 2004, MCI added disc brakes as an option. In 2010, MCI added its "Bendix" suspension system to the J4500, improving handling.

Facelift
In 2013, MCI updated the design of the J-Series with re-designed headlights and a more squared off body. As well as changes to the exterior new features were also added in 2013 such as a steerable tag axle. Due to the added features and new design, the E-Series was quietly discontinued. In 2018, the interior was re-designed and luggage lights were added as an option.

J4500 CHARGE (battery-electric)
In May 2018, MCI announced that its prototype battery-electric J-Series coach (then known as the J4500e) successfully completed phase one of its testing. In 2021, MCI announced the production electric version of the J-Series called the J4500 CHARGE, with the "CHARGE" suffix meaning "Battery-Electric" in NFI Group's nomenclature. The J4500 CHARGE has a range of 200 miles and is powered by Siemens electric motors.

J3500
The J3500 was introduced in 2018 as a shorter 35-foot version of the existing 45-foot model to compete with other similar 35 foot coaches such as the TEMSA TS-35 and Van Hool CX35. The J3500 is MCI's first 35 foot coach since the discontinuation of the DINA produced F3500. The first J3500 was delivered to Tuscaloosa Charter Service in January 2019.

See also
MCI D-Series

References

External links
MCI J-Series Website

Buses of Canada
Buses of the United States
Intercity buses
Single-deck buses
Tri-axle buses
Vehicles introduced in 2001